Mount Einstein is an  elevation glaciated summit located  northwest of Valdez in the Chugach Mountains of the U.S. state of Alaska. This remote mountain, sixth-highest in the Chugach range, is situated at the head of Yale Glacier on land managed by Chugach National Forest. The mountain was named in 1955 by members of the Chugach Mountains Expedition, and officially adopted by the United States Geological Survey to honor physicist Dr. Albert Einstein (1879–1955), one of the greatest scientists of all time, known for his Theory of relativity. The first ascent of Mt. Einstein was made June 17, 1957, by David Bohn, Arthur Maki, Jr., Don Mokski, Martin Mushkin, and Lawrence E. Nielsen.

Climate

Based on the Köppen climate classification, Mount Einstein is located in a subarctic climate zone with long, cold, snowy winters, and mild summers. Weather systems coming off the Gulf of Alaska are forced upwards by the Chugach Mountains (orographic lift), causing heavy precipitation in the form of rainfall and snowfall. Temperatures can drop below −20 °C with wind chill factors below −30 °C. This climate supports the Yale and Columbia Glaciers surrounding this mountain. The months May through June offer the most favorable weather for climbing or viewing.

See also

List of mountain peaks of Alaska
Geography of Alaska

References

External links
 Weather: Mount Einstein
  National Weather Service Forecast
 Mt. Einstein from Columbia Bay: Flickr photo
 Mt. Einstein: Flickr photo

Einstein
Einstein
Einstein